The Waikerie railway line was a railway line on the South Australian Railways network.

Route
 
The Waikerie railway line branched from the Barmera railway line at Karoonda, which was also the junction for the Peebinga railway line on the other side of the main line. It extended north, north-east, and north again to Waikerie, on the cliffs above the Murray River.

History
Before construction started on the Waikerie railway, there was active discussion about where it should branch from the Barmera or Adelaide-Wolseley line. Eventually, the decision was made that it should branch from Karoonda at the 30-mile siding from Tailem Bend. Other possible branching points at that stage included the 40-mile (Borrika) and 58½ miles (Mindarie) from Tailem Bend. There was also a proposal to branch from the 20-mile mark (Wynarka). The line opened on 23 September 1914.

The Waikerie line was part of a significant expansion of the railways in South Australia in the early part of the 20th century to facilitate greater development of the rural areas of the state. The estimated cost of the  Karoonda-Waikerie line, including rolling stock, was £251,350, with expected revenue of £10,000 per annum, working expenses of £10,820, and interest costs of £10,054. It was anticipated by the Railways Commissioner that the loss here would be £10,874 per annum. The contract for the first  was accepted for £16,220 in January 1914. The Galga to Waikerie section closed on 14 March 1990, followed by the Karoonda-Galga section on 4 March 1994.

See also
Rail transport in South Australia

References

Closed railway lines in South Australia
Railway lines opened in 1914
Railway lines closed in 1994